The European Bureau for Lesser-Used Languages (EBLUL) was a non-governmental organisation that was set up to promote linguistic diversity and languages. It was founded in 1982 and discontinued in 2010. The organisation had close ties with both the European Parliament and the Council of Europe, and was funded by both the European Commission and local and regional governmental organisations.

Following its establishment in 1982, the European Bureau for Lesser-Used Languages worked to strengthen contacts and develop mutual co-operation between lesser-used language communities.  The main goal was to promote linguistic diversity and to support these languages.  It acted to facilitate links and communications with the European institutions, the Council of Europe, the OSCE, and UN and UNESCO. It spoke on behalf of Europe's 50 million speakers of regional or minority languages.

EBLUL's operational grant was discontinued by the EU in 2007 despite recommendations from the European Parliament, including the 2003 Ebner Report and the EU's own evaluation conducted by Ernst and Young that the EU should continue to support the organisation. The cut in funding remains controversial because the 2003 Ebner Report  a European Parliament legislative report, which has to be implemented by the EU, recommended that EBLUL continue to receive EU funding.

However, with the cut in its core funding, EBLUL was finally closed by a decision of its board of directors on 27 January 2010.  The main reason given was that "the funding mechanism of such an organisational model [was] not suitable in current circumstances".

EBLUL has since been replaced by the European Language Equality Network (ELEN) the European NGO for lesser-used languages, it gathers most of the former EBLUL members plus many more civil society organisations from across Europe. To date, ELEN represents 44 languages with 60 member organisations in 20 European states.

See also
 European Charter for Regional or Minority Languages
 Framework Convention for the Protection of National Minorities
 Languages of the European Union
 Colin H. Williams,(1991) Language in Geographic Context: Linguistic minorities, society, and territory. Kogaｎ Page．

References

External links
 European Language Equality Network
 Council of Europe: Charter for Regional or Minority Languages
 Council of Europe: Framework Convention for the Protection of National Minorities
 United Nations: Declaration on the Rights of Persons Belonging to National or Ethnic, Religious and Linguistic Minorities

Council of Europe
Politics of Europe
Linguistics organizations
International organizations based in Europe
Organizations established in 1982
1982 establishments in Europe
Languages of Europe